The so-called Alcestis Barcinonensis is a mythological poem of at least 124 Latin hexameters on the story of Alcestis dying for the sake of her husband Admetus, following by and large the play by Euripides. The poem has been written on four papyrus leaves (papyri Barcinonenses inv. no. 158ab, 159ab, 160ab and 161a) dated to the second half of the fourth century on account of the handwriting, an early half-uncial with cursive elements, and inserted into a codex mixtus at some later point in time. The editio princeps has been published by the Catalan priest and papyrologist Ramon Roca-Puig on 18 October 1982. The papyrus leaves are now in the possession of the foundation Sant Lluc Evangelista founded by Roca-Puig and located in Barcelona (in Latin: Barcino, hence the specifying adjective).

Discovery and publication 
The Alcestis occupies folia 33–36 of the codex mixtus. It is preceded by Cicero’s Catilinarians 1 and 2 (folia 1–24a), a Latin psalmus responsorius (folia 24b–28a) and a Greek liturgical text  (folia 29b–32). The dating goes back to E. A. Lowe, who dates the psalmus responsorius to the second half of the fourth century and, copied by the same hand, the Alcestis as well.

The decipherment and interpretation of the papyrus has been pushed ahead at four places simultaneously: by Wolfgang Dieter Lebek at the University of Cologne, by Peter J. Parsons, Robin G. M. Nisbet, and G. O. Hutchinson at the University of Oxford, by Miroslav Marcovich at the University of Illinois at Urbana-Champaign and by Vincenzo Tandoi at the University of Foggia.

Contents and structure 
The poem falls into five parts, each comprising two or three sections.
In lines 1–20 Admetus, husband of Alcestis, learns from Apollo that he shall die soon, unless he finds somebody willing to die in his place. Therefore, Admetus turns to his father (21–42) and to his mother (42–70), but both deny his request. Only Alcestis is ready to swap her life for his, but asks him not to remarry after her death (71–103). The end of the poem describes the death of Alcestis (104–124).

Literary history 
The Alcestis Barcinonensis belongs to the late Latin genre of poetical exercises in verified mythological ethopoeia. A parallel is to be found in the poem Alcesta of the Anthologia Latina (I, no. 15 Riese) comprising 162 hexameters. Comparable pieces of this kind of late Latin poetry connected to the imperial court are the mythological exercises of Dracontius such as Hylas and in particular Claudian’s mythological epic De raptu Proserpinae.

References

Editions and further reading 
in chronological order

Editions and commentaries
 Ramon Roca-Puig: Alcestis. Hexamètres Llatins. Papyri Barcinonenses Inv. no 158–161. Barcelona 1982. – Editio princeps.
 Wolfgang Dieter Lebek: Das neue Alcestis-Gedicht der Papyri Barcinonenses. In: Zeitschrift für Papyrologie und Epigraphik 52, 1983, 1-29. – Critical edition with commentary and German translation.
 Miroslav Marcovich: Alcestis Barcinonensis. In: Illinois Classical Studies 9, 1984, 111-34, online. (PDF). – Critical edition with introduction and English translation.
 Vincenzo Tandoi (ed.): Anonymi Carmen de Alcestide nuper repertum. Foggia 1984 (Estratto da Quaderni dell’Associazione Italiana di Cultura Classica di Foggia, IV). – Critical edition with introduction, commentary, and Italian translation.
 Miroslav Marcovich (ed.): Alcestis Barcinonensis. Text and Commentary. Brill, Leiden, 1988 (Mnemosyne, Supplements, 103), online. – Critical edition with introduction, commentary, and English translation.
 Hans Armin Gärtner (ed.), in: Michael von Albrecht (Hrsg.), Die römische Literatur in Text und Darstellung, Bd. 5: Kaiserzeit II. Von Tertullian bis Boethius. Reclam, Stuttgart, 1988, 170–178. – Partial edition without apparatus, but with short introduction and German translation.
 Lorenzo Nosarti (ed.): Anonimo, L’Alcesti di Barcellona. Introduzione, testo, traduzione e commento. Pàtron, Bologna, 1992 (Edizione e Saggi Universitari di Filologia Classica, 51). – Critical edition with introduction, commentary, and Italian translation. – Review by Harry M. Hine, in: The Classical Review (New Series) 49, 1999, 269-270.
 Gabriel Nocchi Macedo (ed.): L'Alceste de Barcelone (P.Monts. Roca inv. 158–161). Édition, traduction et analyse contextuelle d'un poème latin conservé sur papyrus. Presses Universitaires de Liège, Liège 2014 (Papyrologica Leodiensia, 3). – Review by Hubert Zehnacker, in: Bryn Mawr Classical Review 2014.10.61.

Studies
 Peter J. Parsons, R. G. M. Nisbet, G. O. Hutchinson: Alcestis in Barcelona. In: Zeitschrift für Papyrologie und Epigraphik 52, 1983, 31-36.
 Jacques Schwartz: Le papyrus latin d’Alceste et l’oeuvre de Claudien. In: Zeitschrift für Papyrologie und Epigraphik 52, 1983, 37-.
 Vincenzo Tandoi: La nuova Alcesti di Barcellona. In: Disiecti membra poetae. Studi di poesia latina in frammenti. Band 1, Foggia 1984, 233-45.
 Christoph Schäublin: Zur Alcestis Barcinonensis. In: Museum Helveticum 41, 1984, 174-81.
 Geoffrey Harrison, Dirk Obbink: Vergil, Georgics I 36–39 and the Barcelona Alcestis. In: Zeitschrift für Papyrologie und Epigraphik 63, 1986, 75-81.
 Miroslav Marcovich: The Alcestis Papyrus Revisited. In: Zeitschrift für Papyrologie und Epigraphik 65, 1986, 39-57.
 Wolfgang Dieter Lebek: Die Alcestis Barcinonensis: Neue Konjekturen und Interpretationen. In: Zeitschrift für Papyrologie und Epigraphik 70, 1987, 39-48.
 Nicholas Horsfall: Alcestis Barcinonensis 67: Some metrical problems. In: Zeitschrift für Papyrologie und Epigraphik 77, 1989, 25–26, online (PDF).
 Wolfgang Dieter Lebek: Postmortale Erotik und andere Probleme der Alcestis Barcinonensis. In: Zeitschrift für Papyrologie und Epigraphik 76, 1989, 19–26, online (PDF).
 Kurt Smolak: § 549. Alcestis. In: Restauration und Erneuerung. Die lateinische Literatur von 284 bis 374 n. Chr. Hg. v. Reinhart Herzog (Handbuch der lateinischen Literatur der Antike, hg. v. Reinhart Herzog und Peter Lebrecht Schmidt, Fünfter Band). C. H. Beck, München 1989.
 Dimitrios Mantzilas: Reception and Genre Cross–Reference in Alcestis Barcinonensis. In: Graeco–Latina Brunensia 16, 2011, 2, 61-90, (online) (PDF).
Anna Maria Wasyl, "Alcestis" barcelońska oraz centon "Alcesta". Późnoantyczne spojrzenie na mit i gatunek. Wydawnictwo Uniwersytetu Jagiellońskiego, Kraków 2018.

External links
 Giovanni Salanitro (Catania): L’Alcesti latina, online

Late Latin literature